Ali Barak (born 26 February 2003) is a professional footballer who plays as a left-back for Roda JC Kerkrade. Born in Germany, he is a youth international for Turkey.

Club career
Barak was a youth player at Bayer Leverkusen before moving to Roda JC on trial in the summer of 2022. He signed a one-year contract after impressing enough in three pre-season matches. Barak made his debut in the Eerste Divisie for Roda JC on 5 August 2022, starting in a 2–0 win against Dordrecht.

International career
Born in Germany, Barak is of Turkish descent. He was called up to the represent the Turkey U21s for a set of matches in September 2022.

Career statistics

References

External links
 
 
 

2003 births
Living people
German people of Turkish descent
Turkish footballers
German footballers
Footballers from Düsseldorf
Turkey under-21 international footballers
Eerste Divisie players
Bayer 04 Leverkusen players
Roda JC Kerkrade players
Turkish expatriate footballers
German expatriate footballers
Turkish expatriate sportspeople in the Netherlands
German expatriate sportspeople in the Netherlands
Expatriate footballers in the Netherlands